Harunobu (written: 春信 or 晴信) is a masculine Japanese given name. Notable people with the name include:

 (1567–1612), Japanese daimyō
 (born 1969), Japanese fencer
 (1725–1770), Japanese Ukiyo-e artist
 (born 1965), Japanese politician
Takeda Shingen (1521 –1573), Japanese daimyō who was referred to as  throughout his life.

See also
Harunobu (crater), crater on Mercury

Japanese masculine given names